Charles Kong Djou (born August 9, 1970) is an American politician who served as U.S. representative for Hawaii's 1st congressional district from 2010 to 2011. Appointed by President Joe Biden, Djou currently serves as the Secretary of the American Battle Monuments Commission. A former member of the Republican Party, Djou won his congressional seat in a May 2010 special election where the Democratic Party vote was split between several candidates. He was defeated in the November general election after the Democratic primary provided a single opponent.

Djou, who previously served in the Hawaii House of Representatives and on the Honolulu City Council, was the first Thai American of any party and the first Chinese American Republican to serve in the U.S. House of Representatives. In June 2016, he entered the race for mayor of Honolulu, which he lost, 48% to 52%, to incumbent Kirk Caldwell.

, Djou was the last Republican to have represented Hawaii in Congress. He left the Republican Party in 2018 and in 2020 endorsed Joe Biden for president.

Early life, education, and career
Born in Los Angeles, California, to a Chinese father from Shanghai and a Thai Chinese mother from Bangkok, Djou grew up in Hawaii after his father's employer transferred him there when Djou was three. He graduated from high school at Punahou School, and earned a Bachelor of Arts in political science and a Bachelor of Science in economics from the Wharton School of the University of Pennsylvania, graduating magna cum laude. He earned his J.D. degree at the USC Gould School of Law at the University of Southern California.

Djou is a lieutenant colonel in the United States Army Reserve. He has taught as an adjunct professor of law at the University of Hawaii and as an adjunct professor of political science at Hawaii Pacific University.

Djou was Vice Chairman of the Hawaii Republican Party from 1998 to 1999 and was later named legislator of the year by Small Business Hawaii in 2002, 2004, and 2006. In 2006 he was selected as one of the 40 most promising leaders in Hawaii under age 40 by Pacific Business News, and in 2005 was named by Honolulu Weekly as the "Best Politician" in the state.

Hawaii House of Representatives

Elections
In 1998, Djou ran as a Republican for the Hawaii State House of Representatives District 47 seat. He was unopposed in the primary election, but lost to Iris Ikeda Catalani in the general election by 190 votes.

In 2000, he again ran for the Hawaii State House of Representatives District 47 seat. Unopposed in the primary, he faced Catalani in the general election. Catalani faced controversy in the campaign, with allegations that she broke a promise to the Outdoor Circle, a community beautification organization, by posting yard signs. Djou won the race with 52.5 percent of the vote to Catalani's 44.2 percent.

Tenure
As a member of the State House of Representatives, Djou had one term in the Hawaii House of Representatives from 2000 to 2002 and was the Minority Floor Leader. Djou launched a successful campaign to open the State Budget worksheets to the public after being told he could look at the budget worksheets in the committee room but was not allowed to take any notes or make copies of them. The documents detail the budget for various state departments and agencies. He opposed the state "van cam" program launched in 2002 to catch speeders using automated cameras instead of police officers, and successfully campaigned for its elimination.

Honolulu City Council

Elections

In 2002, Djou announced he would run for the Honolulu City Council. He also announced he would move to East Honolulu (City Council District IV) from Kaneohe (City Council District III) to avoid running against fellow Republican Stan Koki. Honolulu City and County elections are officially nonpartisan, and any candidate who wins a majority of the votes in the primary election can win outright. No candidate received a majority of the votes in the primary election, so Djou and Robert Fishman, a former City Managing Director and Chief of Staff to the Governor, faced each other in a runoff in the general election. Djou won with 51.3 percent of the vote to Fishman's 39.2 percent.

Djou ran for reelection to the Honolulu City Council. He was unopposed and won the seat by default.

Tenure
In 2002, Djou was elected to the Honolulu City Council, representing District IV (Waikiki to Hawaii Kai). He was reelected in 2006 and was on the council until his election to Congress. On the City Council he was the Chairman of the Zoning Committee, Vice Chair of the Planning Committee and as a member of the Transportation and Public Safety & Services committees.

U.S. House of Representatives

Elections

2010 special

In March 2008, Djou announced well ahead of time that he would run for U.S. Congress in the 2010 cycle, seeking Hawaii's 1st congressional district seat. The seat became vacant on February 28, 2010, when incumbent Neil Abercrombie resigned to run for Governor of Hawaii. Abercrombie's resignation precipitated a special election on May 22, 2010, which Djou entered. Djou was endorsed by former Massachusetts Governor and Presidential candidate Mitt Romney. Djou subsequently endorsed Romney for president in the summer of 2011. Former Hawaii Congresswoman Patricia Saiki, a Republican for whom Djou had once volunteered as a teenager, was Djou's campaign chair.

In the special election, Djou received 39.4 percent of the vote. He defeated five Democrats, four Republicans, and four independent candidates. Among the candidates Djou defeated were former Congressman Ed Case and State Senator Colleen Hanabusa, two Democrats who together polled over 58% of the vote. Djou was sworn in three days later and was in office for the remainder of Abercrombie's 2008 term. He was the first Republican to represent the district in 20 years. He followed Abercrombie and Patsy Mink as the third person to have been in the Honolulu City Council, Hawaii State Legislature and U.S. Congress, and was the first to be elected to all three chambers before age 40.

2010 general

Djou ran for a full term in November 2010. There was some controversy over the use of robocalling by the Congressman's official U.S. House office, both before the election and afterward, but as with all official mass communication between members of the House and their constituents, the phone survey conducted on behalf of Djou's office was approved by the bipartisan Franking Commission as an appropriate use of official resources for the purpose of communicating with constituents.

Djou was defeated by the Democratic nominee, State Senate President Colleen Hanabusa, 53% to 47%. Djou was one of only two Republican incumbents to lose a general election in 2010, along with Joseph Cao in Louisiana.

2012

Djou announced on August 17, 2011, that he would challenge Hanabusa in the 1st district in 2012. A major in the U.S. Army Reserve, Djou suspended his campaign for six months while deployed to Afghanistan with the 3rd Brigade Combat Team, 10th Mountain Division, from September 2011 to March 2012. Djou lost to Hanabusa in the general election, with 45.4% of the vote.

2014

Djou ran for the 1st district again in 2014. Although he garnered a greater percentage of the vote in a general election than any other Republican running for Congress in Hawaii since 1988, he still narrowly lost to Democratic state representative Mark Takai, who received 51.2% of the vote.

Committee assignments
 Committee on Armed Services
 Subcommittee on Readiness
 Subcommittee on Terrorism and Unconventional Threats
 Committee on the Budget

Tenure
Civil unions and gay marriage
Djou opposed Hawaii House Bill 444, a bill to legalize civil unions for same-sex and opposite-sex couples, and supports the federal Defense of Marriage Act. He stated that lawmakers "ignored the will of the people" who enacted Hawaii Constitutional Amendment 2.

Don't ask, don't tell
Djou was one of a handful of Congressional Republicans who voted in favor of an amendment to the 2011 Department of Defense Authorization Bill that would repeal the "Don't ask, don't tell" law and allow gays to serve in the U.S. military.

Immigration
Djou supported comprehensive immigration reform and was one of eight Republicans who voted for the DREAM Act to allow immigrants brought to the U.S. as children earn citizenship through service in the military or obtaining a college education and a job.

South Korean Free Trade Agreement
On May 28, 2010, Djou spoke on the floor of the House in support of approving the South Korean Free Trade Agreement, which was signed by former President George W. Bush on June 30, 2007. Congress approved the agreement on October 11, 2011.

Candidate for Mayor of Honolulu

 Djou announced on June 7, 2016 that he was running for the nonpartisan office of Mayor of Honolulu against incumbent Mayor Kirk Caldwell, former Mayor Peter Carlisle, and at least ten others. In the nonpartisan race, Djou had already received the endorsement of former Governor Ben Cayetano, an anti-rail Democrat. On June 15, Djou announced that retired Federal Judge and former Chair of the Democratic Party of Hawaii, Walter Heen, would chair Djou's campaign, and City Council member Ann Kobayashi, also a Democrat, supported Djou for mayor. With no candidate receiving more than 50% of the vote on August 13, 2016, a decision between the top two candidates, Djou and Caldwell, would be made in the November 8, 2016 election.

Caldwell defeated Djou, 52% to 48%. Though both candidates supported the municipal rail project, its cost overruns were an issue, as well as Caldwell's alleged interference with the Ethics Commission. Labor group support was split between the pair.

Later career
Djou served as the Hawaii state campaign chair of John Kasich's 2016 presidential campaign and urged voters before the 2016 Hawaii caucuses to reject Donald Trump. In 2018, Djou left the Republican Party, citing concerns with its policies and President Trump's character. In October 2019, Djou said, "It would be fair to say that I'm an independent Democratic". On July 9, 2020, Republican Voters Against Trump released a video in which Djou urged voters to vote against Trump.

Djou is a member of the ReFormers Caucus of Issue One.

On March 9, 2020, Djou published an op-ed article in Honolulu Civil Beat announcing that he would not enter the 2020 Honolulu mayoral election, though he has accused Honolulu politicians of incompetence in handling important issues. Djou wrote, "while it is clear to all that Honolulu is in desperate need of dramatic change and real leadership, I have come to the difficult decision that I am not the best person to lead this charge in the 2020 election." He said he might endorse a candidate but has not yet made a decision.

In addition to his decision not to run for mayor of Honolulu, Djou announced he was selected to serve in the United States Army War College to complete a graduate degree in Strategic Studies. With his decision to set politics aside, Djou wrote, "completing War College will better position me to assume more significant future roles and duties in service to our country. And unfortunately, running for public office this fall would conflict with this military assignment."

In 2020 Djou endorsed Democrat Joe Biden for President, as did 26 other former Republican members of Congress.

In May 2022, President Biden appointed Djou to be secretary of the American Battle Monuments Commission.

Personal life

Djou is married to Stacey Kawasaki Djou, a Japanese American. They have three children. His surname is a French transliteration of the Chinese surname Zhou.

Djou was on the board of directors of the American Lung Association and a member of the Neighborhood Board. He is a member of the Young Business Roundtable, the Rotary Club, and the Hawaii Telecommunications Association.

Since 2010, Djou has contributed op-ed articles as a writer for Honolulu Civil Beat, a local nonprofit journalism website.

See also
List of Asian Americans and Pacific Islands Americans in the United States Congress

References

External links

 
 
 

|-

|-

|-

1970 births
21st-century American politicians
United States Army colonels
American military personnel of Chinese descent
Asian-American city council members
Asian-American members of the United States House of Representatives
Hawaii politicians of Chinese descent
American people of Thai descent
Honolulu City Council members
Living people
Republican Party members of the Hawaii House of Representatives
Members of the United States Congress of Chinese descent
Republican Party members of the United States House of Representatives from Hawaii
Military personnel from California
Politicians from Los Angeles
Punahou School alumni
United States Army reservists
University of Hawaiʻi faculty
University of Pennsylvania alumni
USC Gould School of Law alumni
Wharton School of the University of Pennsylvania alumni
Asian conservatism in the United States